Saum may refer to:

 Remington Short Action Ultra Magnum rifle cartridges, also known as RSAUM, and RSUM, available in two calibers: 
.300 SAUM
7mm SAUM
Sawm, an Arabic word for fasting regulated by Islamic jurisprudence
Saum, Minnesota, United States, an unincorporated community
Roland Saum, former guitarist for the Swiss band Sportsguitar
Sherri Saum, American actress